The women's 100 metres hurdles event at the 2006 World Junior Championships in Athletics was held in Beijing, China, at Chaoyang Sports Centre on 17 and 18 August.

Medalists

Results

Final
18 August
Wind: 0.0 m/s

Semifinals
18 August

Semifinal 1
Wind: -1.6 m/s

Semifinal 2
Wind: -0.3 m/s

Semifinal 3
Wind: -1.7 m/s

Heats
17 August

Heat 1
Wind: +1.1 m/s

Heat 2
Wind: +0.5 m/s

Heat 3
Wind: +0.5 m/s

Heat 4
Wind: +0.8 m/s

Heat 5
Wind: +0.1 m/s

Participation
According to an unofficial count, 41 athletes from 30 countries participated in the event.

References

100 metres hurdles
Sprint hurdles at the World Athletics U20 Championships